Carl Alfred "C. A." Halverson (October 27, 1886 – June 3, 1947) was an American farmer, educator, and politician.

Born in Cottonwood County, Minnesota, Halverson graduated from Windom High School and then went to the University of Minnesota Agriculture College. He then taught school and was a farmer. He served on the Cotton County Board of Commissioners. He also served on the Lamberton Township Board and on the Lamberton School Board. From 1933 to 1936, Halverson served in the Minnesota House of Representatives, where he was succeeded by Thomas Bondhus. He then served as Minnesota State Treasurer from 1937 to 1939. He died at his home, in Revere, Minnesota, from heart problems.

Notes

External links

1886 births
1947 deaths
People from Cottonwood County, Minnesota
University of Minnesota College of Food, Agricultural and Natural Resource Sciences alumni
Educators from Minnesota
Farmers from Minnesota
Minnesota city council members
County commissioners in Minnesota
School board members in Minnesota
Members of the Minnesota House of Representatives
State treasurers of Minnesota
20th-century American politicians